Sidney Mountain is a mountain located in the Catskill Mountains of New York south of Sidney. Neff Hill is located west and Pine Hill is located east-northeast of Sidney Mountain.

References

Mountains of Delaware County, New York
Mountains of New York (state)